The Collective Bargaining Convention is  an International Labour Organization Convention.

Ratifications 
As of 2022, the convention is ratified by 50 states.

See also

Freedom of association
Freedom of assembly
Right to Organise and Collective Bargaining Convention

References

External links 
 Text of the convention.
 Ratifications.

International Labour Organization conventions
Treaties concluded in 1981
Treaties entered into force in 1983
Freedom of association
Treaties of Antigua and Barbuda
Treaties of Albania
Treaties of Argentina
Treaties of Armenia
Treaties of Azerbaijan
Treaties of Belarus
Treaties of Belgium
Treaties of Belize
Treaties of Benin
Treaties of Bosnia and Herzegovina
Treaties of Brazil
Treaties of Colombia
Treaties of Cyprus
Treaties of Gabon
Treaties of Greece
Treaties of Finland
Treaties of Guatemala
Treaties of Hungary
Treaties of Kyrgyzstan
Treaties of Latvia
Treaties of North Macedonia
Treaties of Mauritius
Treaties of Moldova
Treaties of Morocco
Treaties of the Netherlands
Treaties of Niger
Treaties of Romania
Treaties of Russia
Treaties of Norway
Treaties of Saint Lucia
Treaties of San Marino
Treaties of São Tomé and Príncipe
Treaties of Slovakia
Treaties of Slovenia
Treaties of Spain
Treaties of Suriname
Treaties of Switzerland
Treaties of Sweden
Treaties of Tanzania
Treaties of Tunisia
Treaties of Uganda
Treaties of Ukraine
Treaties of Uruguay
Treaties of Uzbekistan
Treaties of Zambia
Treaties of Lithuania
1981 in labor relations